The College of Arts and Sciences (CAS) is the liberal arts and sciences unit of the University of Washington. In autumn 2017, the CAS offered more than 5,887 different courses and had an enrollment of 21,025 students, making it the largest division of the university.

History
The College of Arts and Sciences is considered to have been established in 1861, when the University itself was founded. However, the College was technically incorporated when the Territorial Legislature enacted ‘An Act to Incorporate the University to the Territory of Washington’. Section 9 of the Act stipulated that the university have four departments: literature, science and the arts; law; medicine; and a military department. However, only literature, science and music were available according to territorial newspaper advertisements announcing the opening of the university placed by the Rev. Daniel Bagley in September 1861.

Divisions

Arts
The Arts Division includes all of the university's arts units, including the Henry Art Gallery, Burke Museum of Natural History and Culture, and Meany Center for the Performing Arts. It includes the following departments:
 School of Art + Art History + Design
 Department of Dance
 Center for Digital Arts and Experimental Media (DXARTS)
 School of Drama
 School of Music

Catherine Cole serves as the dean of the Arts Division.

Humanities
The Humanities Division includes the following departments:
 Department of Asian Language and Culture
Department of Cinema and Media Studies
 Department of Classics
 Department of Comparative History of Ideas (CHID)
Department of Comparative Literature
 Department of English
 Department of French and Italian Studies
 Department of German Studies
 Department of Linguistics
 Department of Near Eastern Language and Culture
 Department of Scandinavian Studies
 Department of Slavic Language and Culture
 Department of Spanish and Portuguese Studies

Michael Shapiro serves as the dean of the Humanities Division.

Social Sciences
The Social Sciences Division includes the following departments:
 Department of American Ethnic Studies
 Department of American Indian Studies
 Department of Anthropology
 Department of Communication
 Department of Economics
 Department of Gender, Women and Sexuality Studies (GWSS)
 Department of Geography
 Department of History
 Jackson School of International Studies (JSIS)
 Department of Law, Societies, and Justice
 Department of Philosophy
 Department of Political Science
 Department of Sociology

George Lovell serves as the dean of the Social Sciences Division.

Natural Sciences
The Natural Sciences Division includes the following departments:
 Department of Applied Mathematics
 Department of Astronomy
 Department of Biology
 Department of Chemistry
 Department of Mathematics
 Department of Physics
 Department of Psychology
 Department of Speech and Hearing Sciences
 Department of Statistics

Suzanne Hawley serves as the dean of the Natural Sciences Division.

Centers and institutes
The College contains more than 30 centers and institutes, including the Center for Labor Studies, Institute for Learning and Brain Sciences, Institute for Nuclear Theory, and Simpson Center for the Humanities.

References

External links
UW College of Arts & Sciences Official Website

Colleges, schools, and departments of the University of Washington
Liberal arts colleges at universities in the United States
Educational institutions established in 1861
1861 establishments in Washington Territory